The Mississippi and Missouri Railroad (M&M Railroad) was the first railroad in Iowa. It was chartered in 1853 to build a line between Davenport, Iowa, on the Mississippi River and Council Bluffs, Iowa, on the Missouri River. The railroad was the first west of the Mississippi river to join by bridge to the East. It played an important role in the construction of the First transcontinental railroad.  The competing Cedar Rapids and Missouri River Railroad actually became the first Iowa railroad to reach Council Bluffs from the Mississippi River. Thomas C. Durant, vice president of the Union Pacific Railroad, owned stock in both.

History
The line originally was created so that the Chicago and Rock Island Railroad could extend its line across the Mississippi River via the Rock Island Bridge, the first bridge to cross the Mississippi.

Shortly after the bridge opened in 1856, a steamboat hit the bridge and steamboat companies sued to have the bridge dismantled.  The M&M and Rock Island hired private attorney Abraham Lincoln to defend the bridge. The case was to work its way through the courts to reach U.S. Supreme Court in 1862 during the American Civil War when the court decided in the bridge's favor.

During Lincoln's investigation into the case, he traveled to Council Bluffs to inspect M&M property in August 1859 under the guidance of the M&M attorney Norman Judd. On the visit Judd and M&M engineer Grenville Dodge described the merits of locating the eastern terminus of the railroad at Council Bluffs. After the Pacific Railroad Act in 1862, Lincoln selected Council Bluffs as the eastern terminus and the Union Pacific created by former M&M owner Thomas C. Durant as the company to build the railroad road eastward.

Durant was slow to build the M&M through Iowa although quick to manipulate its stock.

Durant built up his fortune by manipulating the M&M stock via rumors. First he drove up M&M stock by saying the transcontinental railroad would travel across Iowa via the M&M while at the same time quietly buying depressed Cedar Rapids and Missouri Railroad (CR&M) stock. Then he spread rumors that drove up the CR&M stock that the transcontinental would follow that line instead and Durant bought back the newly depressed M&M stock. The gambit made Durant and his cohorts $5 million.

The Rock Island Line bought the M&M on July 9, 1866, and completed its line to Council Bluffs in 1869 and extended the Muscatine/Washington Line to Leavenworth, Kansas. The merged railroad was called the Chicago, Rock Island and Pacific Railroad, a name it kept until it was dissolved in bankruptcy in the 1970s.

See also

Cedar Rapids and Missouri River Railroad

References

Predecessors of the Chicago, Rock Island and Pacific Railroad
Defunct Iowa railroads
Rail lines receiving land grants
Railway companies established in 1853
Railway companies disestablished in 1866
1853 establishments in Iowa